Obediah Winston Farm is a historic tobacco farm complex and national historic district located near Creedmoor, Granville County, North Carolina.  The farmhouse was built about 1855, and is a two-story, five bay, Greek Revival style heavy timber frame dwelling.  Also on the property are the contributing log outbuilding, slave house, potato house, stable, smokehouse, packhouse, tobacco barn, and tenant house.

It was listed on the National Register of Historic Places in 1988.

References

Tobacco buildings in the United States
Farms on the National Register of Historic Places in North Carolina
Historic districts on the National Register of Historic Places in North Carolina
Greek Revival houses in North Carolina
Houses completed in 1855
Houses in Granville County, North Carolina
National Register of Historic Places in Granville County, North Carolina